Edward Herbert Beresford "Chip" Monck (born March 5, 1939) is an American Tony Award nominated lighting designer, most famously serving as the master of ceremonies at the 1969 Woodstock Festival.

Personal history
Monck was born in Wellesley, Massachusetts to a mother from Nutley, New Jersey and a father from Liverpool, England. He acquired the nickname "Chip" at a summer camp on Lake Winnipesaukee, in New Hampshire. While Monck went to the South Kent School on scholarships for ice hockey and crew, he became more interested in welding and machinery, designing a potato harvester that he sold to McCormick. He began volunteering with a summer theater group at Wellesley College, learning the basics of theatrical lighting from Greg Harney. He began auditing classes at Harvard while working with the university's theater company.

Early career
Monck began working at the Greenwich Village nightclub The Village Gate in 1959, lighting comedians and jazz and folk artists, and living in the basement apartment under the club where Bob Dylan eventually wrote "A Hard Rain's A-Gonna Fall" on Monck's IBM Selectric typewriter. He began extensive relationships with both the Newport Folk Festival and the Newport Jazz Festival, lasting eight and nine years, respectively,
while continuing to work at the Gate. He became friends with Charles Altman of the Altman Lighting Co., repairing equipment and borrowing lighting instruments to improve the stage lighting of the Gate. He began lighting the stage of the Apollo Theater in Harlem.

In 1967, he lit the Monterey Pop Festival, which featured the first major American appearances by Jimi Hendrix and The Who, as well as the first major public performances of Janis Joplin. Monck's work can be seen in the D. A. Pennebaker film Monterey Pop. That year, he also lit The Byrds at the Hollywood Bowl and his first Rolling Stones concert. The following year, he designed the distinctive half-shell stage at the Miami Pop Festival (December 1968), called the Flying Stage, that was one of the festival's two, simultaneously operating main stages. In 1969 he worked with Crosby, Stills and Nash in Europe, and began working with concert impresario Bill Graham, renovating the Fillmore theaters.

Woodstock
In 1969 he lit the concert that would define his career and make him a public figure. Monck was hired to plan and build the staging and lighting for the Woodstock Music & Art Fair's "Aquarian Exposition" music festival. Paid $7,000 for ten weeks of work, much of his plan had to be scrapped when the promoters were not allowed to use the original location in Wallkill, New York. The stage roof that was constructed in the shorter time available was not able to support the lighting that had been rented, which wound up sitting unused underneath the stage. The only light on the stage was from spotlights.

Just before the concert started, Monck was drafted as the master of ceremonies when Michael Lang noticed that they had forgotten to hire one. He can be heard (and seen) in recordings of Woodstock making the stage announcements, including requests to "stay off the towers" and the warning about the "brown acid".

The Rolling Stones
Four months after Woodstock, Monck and Lang planned the Altamont Free Concert for the Rolling Stones, which also had to move from the original planned location, but this time with unfortunate consequences. Members of the Hells Angels motorcycle club were hired to provide security for the concert with terrible results. Monck confronted a member of the Angels stealing a large custom carpet that was part of the Rolling Stones stage set and lost teeth being hit in the mouth with a pool cue. He later tracked down the person and managed to trade a case of brandy for the carpet.

Monck used an innovative method of stage lighting for the 1972 tour, which was designed for him by Michael Callahan, a NYC high school student interested in concert lighting.  Callahan devised the Mirror Followspot System after Monck complained about the inconsistency in how close followspots were to the stage as the distance varied from arena to arena. Instead of raising 3,000 pounds of lamps to overhead trusses, Monck had built from Callahan's drawings a 40' x 8' array of Mylar mirrors. A row of spotlights sitting on the floor behind the stage bounced light off the mirrors onto the stage.

Later career

In 1974, Monck was the host of Speakeasy, a short-lived rock and roll talk show that featured mostly chat and some live performances by such acts as Tom Waits, Frank Zappa and Emerson, Lake and Palmer. Monck's persona was well-known enough to be parodied as "Chick Monk" on SCTV by Tony Rosato as a marriage counselor employing strobe lights and a fog machine.

Also in 1974, he provided production services for the Muhammad Ali/George Foreman boxing match The Rumble in the Jungle, and the associated three-day music festival Zaire 74, which featured performances by James Brown, Celia Cruz and the Fania All-Stars, B.B. King, Miriam Makeba, The Spinners, Bill Withers, and Manu Dibango. Monck's work can be seen in the films Soul Power and When We Were Kings.

He was the lighting designer for the Opening and Closing Ceremonies of the 1984 Summer Olympics in Los Angeles,  as well as consulting on the 2000 Summer Olympics in Sydney.

In 2003, Monck received the Parnelli Award for Lifetime Achievement in the concert touring industry.

As of 2011, Monck resides in the Melbourne suburb of Fitzroy, Australia concentrating on corporate and retail lighting.

In 2011, he served as the Director of Production of the One Great Night On Earth Festival, planned for December 1, 2012. This event was intended to raise funds to help Australians in regions devastated by natural disasters like the Black Saturday bushfires, flooding and drought.

References

External links
 Official webpage
 
An interview by Scott Simon on National Public Radio, 2004.

1939 births
Living people
Masters of ceremonies
People from Wellesley, Massachusetts
South Kent School alumni